Amr Waked (born ) is an Egyptian film, television and stage actor. He is best known to international audiences and in Hollywood for his role in the 2005 film Syriana. Other prominent roles include a Yemeni Sheikh called Muhammad in Salmon Fishing in the Yemen, Pierre Del Rio in Luc Besson's Lucy and Farouk Hassan in  Ramy. 

In 2019, Waked was sentenced to eight years in prison by an Egyptian military court for spreading false news and insulting state institutions. For that reason, he has no intention of returning to Egypt. He has been residing in Spain since October 2017.

Career

Waked's first major role was in Ashab wallah business (2002) (Are we friends or just a business). Reviewers reported that he portrayed the role of "Gehad" so well that many viewers left the theater believing he was actually a Palestinian actor, rather than Egyptian.  His first lead role was as Ahmed in Deil el Samaka (The Fish's tail) (2003), and in 2005 he worked alongside George Clooney in the film Syriana, for which in 2006 he won a 'Special Award for Arabs in The International Cinema' at the Cairo International Film Festival.  Waked joined the cast of the Egyptian television series Lahazat Harega (Critical Moments) in 2007, shooting 32 episodes for season one.

In 2008, Waked joined the cast of the BBC/HBO television series House of Saddam to portray Saddam Hussein's son-in-law Hussein Kamel.  Since the lead role of Saddam Hussein was played by Israeli actor Yigal Naor, Waked faced punishment by Egypt's Actors Union which opposes normalization of ties with Israel.  The union threatened to ban him from all future projects in Egypt. Waked was also criticized by supporters of the Palestinian cause for taking acting role in Wonder Woman 1984 starring Israeli actress and former IDF soldier Gal Gadot.

In 2009, Waked co-hosted the 33rd Cairo International Film Festival, and in 2010 he rejoined the cast of Lahazat Harega. He joined Hollywood stars Matt Damon, Jude Law, Kate Winslet, and Gwyneth Paltrow in the 2011 film, Contagion and co-starred in the British film Salmon Fishing in the Yemen with Emily Blunt, Ewan McGregor, and Kristin Scott Thomas. and also co-starred in Lucy alongside Morgan Freeman and Scarlett Johansson. In 2017, he moved to Spain and was sentenced to eight years in prison by an Egyptian court for making pro-democracy comments on social media. Due to these charges, Waked is not able to return to Egypt.

Since 2019, Waked has played the father of main character Ramy Hassan on the Hulu series Ramy.

Filmography

Films

Television 
 Lahazat Harega ( Critical Moments) Season  One (32+ episodes, 2007)
 House of Saddam (3 episodes, 2008)
 The Shooting of Thomas Hurndall (2008)
 Lahazat Harega (Critical Moments), Season Two (32+ episodes, 2010)
  Abwab el khoof (2011)
  Awlaad Al-Shaware'a
  Spiral (season 4) (2012)
  Flight of the Storks (2013)
  Marco Polo (2014)
  Riviera (2017)
  Ramy (2019–present)

Theater
 1992, Afareet Hamza We Fatma as Hamza
 1992, Vinegar Tom as The Devil
 1993, Crimes Of The Heart as Doc
 1993, Al Ghaba Al Saeeda as The Fox
 1994, Tales From Agabad as Hero
 1994, Compass Berserk as Montigu
 1994, The Bus as Ahmed
 1995, Oedipus The President as Prometheus
 2000, Al Ze'ab Yohaddid Al Madinah as The Journalist
 2002, Shabab Rewish Tahn as Ahmed

Recognition

Awards and nominations
 1999, won Film Writers and Critics Special Award at Alexandria International Film Festival
 1999, won Best Supporting Actor award at Alexandria International Film Festival for Gannat al shayateen
 2003, won Best Actor award at Alexandria International Film Festival for Dail el samakah
 2006, won Special Award for Arabs in The International Cinema at Cairo International Film Festival for Syriana
 2006, won Horus Award for Best Supporting Actor at Cairo National Festival for Egyptian Cinema for Dam el ghazal
 2010, won Best Supporting Actor at Dear Guest Festival for Ibrahim Labyad
 2010, won Best Actor for Second Role at Cairo National Festival for Egyptian cinema for Ibrahim Labyad
 2013, won Best Actor at Dubai Film Festival for the Egyptian movie Winter of Discontent

See also
 Cinema of Egypt
 List of Egyptian films of the 2000s

Notes

References

External links 

 
 Carlo Coppola, Anche l’attore Amr Waked sulle barricate del Cairo per la libertà, lsdmagazine.com 

1973 births
Living people
Egyptian male film actors
Egyptian male television actors
Egyptian male stage actors
Male actors from Cairo
The American University in Cairo alumni
20th-century Egyptian male actors
21st-century Egyptian male actors
Expatriate actors in the United States